"I Don't Want to Be a Hero" is a 1987 song by the British band Johnny Hates Jazz. It reached #11 in the UK top 40 in August 1987 spending 10 weeks on the chart. It is taken from their #1 album Turn Back the Clock.

Writing and inspiration
The song was written by the band's lead singer and main songwriter, Clark Datchler. It has a strong anti-war sentiment and is written from the perspective of a soldier who is questioning their participation in what they consider an unjust war. The band's American record company were reluctant to release the single in the U.S. because of its anti-war stance. The song makes references to conscription and propaganda.

In a 1987 interview with Record Mirror, Datchler said, "It's a very profound song but I'm not about to preach to anyone. All my songs are observations and the nice thing about 'I Don't Want to be a Hero' is that you've got a serious subject and putting it with quite a poppy musical backing. I don't think people get involved enough with lyrics in the pop field."

Music video

The international music video for the song was directed by Andy Morahan.

Charts

Weekly charts

Year-end charts

Covers
In 1988, Japanese singer Yōko Nagayama covered the song, "反逆のヒーロー".

See also
List of anti-war songs

References

External links
Johnny Hates Jazz Official Website

Songs about soldiers
Songs about the military
1986 songs
1987 singles
Anti-war songs
Johnny Hates Jazz songs
Music videos directed by Andy Morahan
Songs written by Clark Datchler
Virgin Records singles